The gualgura is an Ecuadorian legend. It is a black chick that has an attractive voice and appears innocent. But when it decides to attack, it transforms into a man with a thick voice which convinces and hypnotizes people, leaving them unconscious or dead. The gualgura comes out at night.

The myth of the gualgura is prevalent among the Afro-Ecuadorian communities in the Pacific province of Esmeraldas. It is linked with other myths of the province: la tunda, el bambero, el duende, la bruja, and el riviel.

References

Ecuadorian culture